Keep Running is a song written by Irish singer-songwriter Gemma Hayes for the fourth studio album Let It Break. It was the second single release from the album.

Background

The song was previously titled 'Tokyo' and some of the lyrics featured on the unreleased track 'Turning'. The song first appeared on her playlist whilst touring Ireland during 2010 and 2011 cultural show Imeall on 21 April 2010.

The song later appeared on the Let It Break track listing as Keep Running. The song was expected to be the first single release from the album.   
Hayes later confirmed that the track 'Tokyo' was changed to 'Keep Running' on the album as the song began to change direction during its production and some of the lyrics may have been interpreted as referencing the 2011 earthquake in Japan, though this was not the actual case.

Release

The song was released as a download only on Friday, 26 August 2011 in Ireland. Outside Ireland, 'Keep Running' was released as promo track in March 2012 following the re-release of Let It Break.

Music video
A music video premiered on 26 August 2011 on her YouTube page. The video was directed by her then boyfriend Brinton Bryan. The single is complemented by a music video which was shot on location in LA in July 2011. The videos theme is based around homelessness, where Gemma Hayes appears as herself alongside US actor Jason Ritter.

Popular culture
The track appeared on a number of US drama series.

References

Gemma Hayes songs
2011 singles
2011 songs
Songs written by Gemma Hayes